Valéry Rakotoarinosy (born 9 April 1986) is a Malagasy football defender who currently plays for Disciples FC.

References

1986 births
Living people
Malagasy footballers
Madagascar international footballers
DSA Antananarivo players
AS Adema players
La Passe FC players
AS JET Mada players
Association football defenders
Malagasy expatriate footballers
Expatriate footballers in Seychelles
Malagasy expatriate sportspeople in Seychelles
People from Antananarivo